The 2012 Golden Globes (Portugal) was held on 20 May 2012 and broadcast by SIC and presented by Bárbara Guimarães.

Winners and nominees

Cinema

Best Film: 
Sangue do Meu Sangue - João Canijo
 América - João Nuno Pinto
 O Barão - Edgar Pêra
 Viagem a Portugal - Sérgio TréfautBest Actor:Nuno Melo - O BarãoNuno Lopes - Sangue do Meu SangueRafael Morais - Sangue do Meu SangueFernando Luís - AméricaBest Actress: Rita Blanco - Sangue do Meu SangueAnabela Moreira - Sangue do Meu SangueMaria de Medeiros - Viagem a PortugalBeatriz Batarda - CisneTheatre

Best Play:   A Varanda - Luís Miguel CintraA Lua de Maria Sem  - Maria João LuísRecordações de uma Revolução - Mónica CalleVermelho - João LourençoBest Actor:Ivo Canelas - AmadeusAntónio Fonseca - VermelhoDinarte Branco - Morte de JudasElmano Sancho - Não se Brinca com o AmorBest Actress: Sandra Faleiro - Quem tem medo de Virginia WoolfMónica Calle - Recordações de uma RevoluçãoLuísa Cruz - A VarandaCatarina Wallenstein -  Não se Brinca com o AmorFashion

Best Stylist:  Miguel VieiraFelipe Oliveira BaptistaLuís BuchinhoOs Burgueses   
Best Male Model:Gonçalo Teixeira - Central ModelsBruno Rosendo - L'AgenceJonathan e Kevin - Central ModelsLuís Borges - Central ModelsBest Female Model: Sara Sampaio - Central ModelsMilena Cardoso - EliteJani - EliteMatilde - Best ModelsSports
Best Male Coach: André Villas-Boas - FootballDomingos Paciência - FootballJosé Mourinho - FootballMário Palma - BasketballBest Male Athlete: Cristiano Ronaldo - FootballArmindo Araújo - MotoringHélder Rodrigues - MotorcycleJoão Pina - JudoBest Female Athlete: Telma Monteiro - JudoAna Dulce Félix - AthleticsNaide Gomes - AthleticsTeresa Portela - Canoeing Music

Best Individual Performer: Jorge Palma - Com Todo o RespeitoFernando Alvim - Fados & Canções do AlvimSérgio Godinho - Mútuo ConsentimentoLuísa Sobral - The Cherry on My CakeBest Group: Amor Electro - Cai o Carmo e a TrindadeBuraka Som Sistema - KombaClã - Disco VoadorDead Combo - Lisboa MulataBest Song: "A Máquina" - Amor Electro (Cai o Carmo e a Trindade)"A Pele que Há em Mim" - Márcia & JP Simões (Dá)"Asas Delta" - Clã (Disco Voador)"Página em Branco" - Jorge Palma (Com todo o Respeito)Best NewcomerNélson Oliveira - SportsAmor Electro - MusicÂngelo Rodrigues - ActingLuísa Sobral - Music ''

Award of Merit and Excellence

Francisco Pinto Balsemão

References

2011 film awards
2011 music awards
2011 television awards
Golden Globes (Portugal)
2012 in Portugal